is a Japanese manga artist.

Kei Toume studied at the Tama Art University in Tokyo. Her first manga, Rokujō gekijō, was published in Comic Burger magazine in 1992. The manga won her the Shiki prize in a contest held by Kodansha in 1993. A year later, her follow-up manga Mannequin also won a prize.

She started the series Lament of the Lamb in Comic Burger in 1996. After the disappearance of this magazine, the manga was continued in Comic Birz. This series ran for six years and was adapted into a radio play, an anime and a live action film.

In 1997, she began Sing "Yesterday" for Me manga. In addition, Toume contributes to a lot of fanzines and specialized magazines, and is also active in video games and films.

Her manga Kurogane and Lament of the Lamb have been translated into English by Del Rey Manga and Tokyopop respectively.

Works
Acony 
Fuguruma-kan Raiho Ki
Gen'ei Hakurankai
Hour of the Mice
Kurogane
Kurogane-kai
Lament of the Lamb
Luno
Momonchi
Our Rhythm Change
Sing "Yesterday" for Me
 Static Noise Princess
 Static Princess
Zero

References

External links

Living people
Women manga artists
Manga artists from Kanagawa Prefecture
People from Zama, Kanagawa
Japanese female comics artists
Tama Art University alumni
Year of birth missing (living people)